Kaneland High School, or KHS, is a public four-year high school located in Maple Park, Illinois, a western suburb of Chicago, United States. It is part of Kaneland Community Unit School District 302.

History
Kaneland first opened in 1958.

In  Molitor v. Kaneland Community Unit District 302, Illinois opened up school districts to civil lawsuits.  The case was over a bus crash during the early years of the school.  The father of a student injured in the crash sued for $56,000.  The court stated that public school districts should not be immune from civil tort action.

Academics
Kaneland's graduating class of 2014 had an average composite ACT score of 22.2, the highest in the school's history, and graduated 100.0% of its senior class.  Kaneland has made Adequate Yearly Progress on the Prairie State Achievement Examination (PSAE), a state test part of the No Child Left Behind Act. In 2013, the school was placed on the Illinois Honor Roll for significantly improving its performance on the PSAE.

Athletics

Kaneland competes in the Interstate Eight Conference and Illinois High School Association. They have a total of eleven Illinois High School State Championships, in football (1997, 1998), boys' track and field (1975, 1977), girls' track and field (1987, 1988, 2016), boys' cross country (1987, 2019), girls' basketball (1982), and baseball (2011).

Kaneland went to the playoffs in football eight times in the past ten school years. From 2010 to 2013, Kaneland did not lose a regular season game.

Notable alumni
 Casey Crosby, current MLB free agent
 Don Beebe, former NFL player; head coach of Aurora University Spartans football
 P. J. Fleck, former NFL player; head coach of Minnesota Golden Gophers football
 Leah Hayes, swimmer, Sports Illustrated Kids 2018 SportsKid of the Year

References

External links
 Official Website

Public high schools in Illinois
Educational institutions established in 1958
Schools in Kane County, Illinois
1958 establishments in Illinois